Banan District, formerly Ba County, is a district of Chongqing municipality.

Geography and Climate
Banan, situated in the south of Sichuan Basin, has a diversity of terrains including mountains, hills, wetlands and flood beds. The lowest point of the district is on its northern border with Nan'an District, at an altitude of 154 meters. The highest point is the top of Fangdou Mountain in the southeast of the district, at an altitude of 1132.6 meters.

The climate of Banan is humid subtropical climate, typically found in Southern China and characterized by hot and humid summers, and mild winters. The average temperature of the year is 18.7 Celsius degrees, but sometimes the temperature can get as low as -1 degree in winter and as high as 41 degrees in summer. The annual precipitation of Banan usually fluctuates between 1000 and 1200 millimeters, with abundant rainfall from May to July.

Administrative divisions

Climate

Transportation
China National Highway 210

Metro
Banan is currently served by two metro lines operated by Chongqing Rail Transit:
 - Dajiang, Yudong 
 - Yudong , Jinzhu, Yuhulu, Xuetangwan, Dashancun, Chaoyouchang, Chalukou, Jiugongli, Qilong, Bagongli

References

Districts of Chongqing